The Peugeot 206 is a supermini car (B-segment) designed and produced by the French car manufacturer Peugeot since May 1998 as a replacement to the Peugeot 205. Developed under the codename T1, it was released in September 1998 in hatchback form, which was followed by coupé cabriolet (206 CC) in September 2000, station wagon (206 SW) in September 2001, and a sedan version (206 SD) in September 2005, before being replaced by the 207 in April 2006.

Its facelifted version was initially launched in South America in September 2008, and in China in November 2008, in hatchback, sedan and station wagon body styles, and marketed as the 207 Compact, and as the 207 respectively. This version was subsequently launched in Europe in February 2009, only in hatchback form and marketed as the 206+. In South America it continued to be offered as the 207 Compact nameplate until January 2017, and furthermore in China, both under the 207 nameplate and as the Citroën C2.

The 206 is the best-selling Peugeot model of all time with 8,358,217 cars sold by 2012. , the car remained to be produced under license in Iran by IKCO. As the result, the 206 was counted as the thirtieth most long-lived single generation car by Autocar magazine.

Overview

Project

During the early 1990s, Peugeot decided not to directly replace the Peugeot 205, citing the reason that superminis were no longer profitable or worthwhile. Instead, Peugeot followed a unique strategy and decided that its new, smaller, supermini, the Peugeot 106 (launched in 1991), would take sales from the lower end of the 205 range while the lowest models of the Peugeot 306 range, launched in 1993 to replace the Peugeot 309, would take sales from the top-end 205s. Between the 106 and 306, Peugeot hoped that the 205 would not need to be replaced, and could be phased out slowly, while customers who would normally plump for the 205 would continue to have a choice with either a smaller or larger car. This strategy did not work. With the 205 phased out, other superminis like the Ford Fiesta and Volkswagen Polo continued to sell well and increased in popularity, and without a direct competitor to these cars Peugeot was losing sales fast. A new supermini was required, and the 206 was launched in 1999 as a somewhat belated replacement for the 205.

On 7 April 1994, Jacques Calvet, then president of Peugeot, approved of the 206 development program codenamed T1, with launch planned by 1997. The in-house design team was led by Peugeot's Head of Design, Murat Günak, and designer . The design was fixed six months after project approval, and the project took 34 months from design freeze to start of production. The development costs a total of 6.3 billion francs, with intensive use of IT as it is their first car designed with a digital mock-up along with crash simulations. The prototype was extensively tested on the Belchamp test circuit in the Valentigney forest. With no larger in-house platform from PEUGEOT to base its new supermini on (the Peugeot 106 shared its platform with the 106), Peugeot developed an all-new front drive platform for the 206.

Powertrain
The 206 was originally launched as a hatchback with 1.1L, 1.4L, and 1.6L petrol engines and a 1.9L diesel engine, an HDi version with common rail coming later. In 2001, two more versions of the 206 were launched – the 206 CC (coupé convertible) with a folding steel roof and the 206 SW station wagon. A 4-door notchback sedan version, developed by Iran Khodro, was unveiled in late 2005, and it is available in the Iranian, North African, Chinese, Russian, Romanian, Turkish and Bulgarian markets.

Production and marketing
The Peugeot 206 was mainly manufactured in Peugeot's Poissy and Mulhouse factories in France until 18 December 2012, as well as in Ryton, United Kingdom, whereas outside Europe it was produced in Iran (Iran Khodro), Chile (for the Mexican and Colombian markets, French-made 206s were cheaper than Chilean-built ones, in Chile), Argentina (PSA), Brazil (PSA), Uruguay (Oferol), China (Dongfeng), Indonesia (Gaya Motor) and Malaysia (Naza). In 2003, it received a minor facelift, getting clear headlights, different rear clusters, new side repeater lamps, chrome badges, a new range of colors, as well as other subtle interior revisions.

The Peugeot 206 was also assembled at its Ryton facility in Coventry, England, however, with the introduction of the 207 to the range, Peugeot decided to close the Ryton factory, ending the 206 production in 12 December 2006 and move production to Slovakia, due to the fact that they could produce their vehicles with same or better quality for a lower price there.

The Peugeot 206 proved to be a sales success all over Europe. It was one of the best-selling car in Europe from 2001 to 2003 and it was the best car of the year in the UK for three consecutive years, between 1998 and 2001. The 1.4-litre XR was the best-selling model. On 26 May 2005, the 206 celebrated the five millionth unit produced since its commercial launch on 10 September 1998. Sales in the United Kingdom were strong from the start, with the 206 regularly being among the nation's five most popular new cars during its first six years on sale. Second hand examples of the 206 traditionally hold their value well, due to high demand.

Production in Brazil took place in Porto Real, Rio de Janeiro, starting in 2001 with the hatchback, followed by the station wagon version in 2005. The models produced there featured 1.0-litre 16-valve, 1.4-litre 8-valve and 1.6-litre 16-valve engines, the last two of which are flexible fuel engines (petrol/ethanol). The 1.0-litre version used a Renault-sourced engine and was produced until 2006.

The Peugeot 206 has also been produced in Villa Bosch, Buenos Aires, Argentina, from July 1999 to December 2016. The trim levels manufactured are XR, XRD, XS, XT and XTD. The diesel powered versions use the naturally aspirated DW engine. Some of these versions are equipped with local-made engines in Jeppener, Buenos Aires.

In May 2006, the Malaysian car manufacturer Naza launched a locally assembled version of the model with the name of 206 Bestari. In 2006, Peugeot started production of the 206 in China. In September 2006, Dongfeng Peugeot-Citroën Automobile launched a slightly modified Peugeot 206 called the Citroën C2 (this car was not related to the European-market Citroën C2).

Body styles

206 SW (T12) 
In 2001, Peugeot showcased a near-production concept version of the 206 SW ("Sports Wagon"). Developed with the codename T12, the production model was released in March 2002 and was manufactured at the Ryton plant. It adopts a reinforced rear axle in order to support the excess weight. In 2007, the 206 SW assembly line was moved to Poissy after the Ryton plant was closed. By the end of its production, 366,000 units were produced.

206 SD (T13)

A notchback sedan model was introduced in Iran in 2006. Developed under the codename T13, it was jointly designed by the Peugeot Design Center for Iran Khodro and is the fifth and last version of Peugeot 206 models.

Since 2006, Iran Khodro started exporting the 206 SD to other countries, including Russia, Ukraine, Turkey, Romania, Bulgaria, and Algeria, along with Serbia, Montenegro and Macedonia.

It was also produced in Brazil, starting from October 2008, with the front end of the 206+ and sold as the 207 Passion. It was not related, however, to the 207 sold in Europe. It was removed from offer in the first quarter of 2015. This model was also offered throughout the rest of Latin America, including in Chile, Argentina, Uruguay, Colombia, Ecuador or Mexico.

In Malaysia and China, it was also locally produced and sold as the 207, solely as a sedan version.

206 CC (T16)

The Peugeot 206 CC was formally launched at the Paris Motor Show in September 2000 and was based on the Peugeot Two-oh-heart concept car, revealed two years before at the Geneva Motor Show. It is a coupé cabriolet featuring a powered fold-away roof based on the Georges Paulin system, first seen on the 1935 Peugeot 402 Eclipse coupe.

It was developed with the codename T16. The roof-trunk modules, specific to the CC are manufactured in Cerizay, France, by the French company Heuliez, which is specialized in producing short series for niche markets such as convertibles or station wagons, while final assembly took place in Mulhouse. Production was stopped in early 2008, and it has since been replaced by the 207 CC.

Variants

Grand Tourisme
In order to homologate the 206 World Rally Car, Peugeot needed to sell road going versions of the 206 that were at least 4.0 metres long (the minimum length stipulated by the FIA for WRC cars). The WRC car was homologated with the 206 Grand Tourisme, similar to the standard 206 but with front and rear body extensions to bring the car from the standard road car's 3.83 meters to the rally car's 4 metre length.
4000 cars in total were produced, each with a unique number on a plaque on the door pillar both sides. 600 right-hand drive cars were produced for the UK. The mechanicals fitted to the Grand Tourisme were what was fitted to the upcoming 206 GTI, not yet released.

GTi 180 and RC

Introduced to the market in 2003, the Peugeot 206 GTi 180 and 206 RC brought high performance to the product range. The range topping GTi 180 was brought to the UK market, while the 206 RC was introduced to the rest of Europe. The new 'hot hatch' used the 2 litre EW10J4S engine, which produced  thanks to variable valve timing and modified inlet and exhaust manifolds. Other features on the 206 GTi 180 and 206 RC include 17 inch alloy wheels, racing bucket front seats, a short shift gear linkage and altered gearbox ratios (1st & 2nd gears). The new car was capable of reaching  in 7.4 seconds.

The 206 GTi 180 and 206 RC were produced to celebrate Peugeot's rallying successes from 2000 to 2003, and to replicate the success Peugeot had with the 205 GTi in the 1980s.

206 Escapade
Following brands like Fiat and Volkswagen, Peugeot sells an off-roader version of the Peugeot 206 in selected South American markets, called the Peugeot 206 Escapade. It is essentially a Peugeot 206 SW station wagon with a rugged SUV-like bodykit and higher and tougher suspension. It is powered with a 1.6L 16v engine.

206 French Dream
The 206 French Dream Edition was launched in late 2007 exclusively in France, targeting french middle class large families. The 206 French Dream Edition was available with interesting financing plans, at slightly higher or equal price than the base model, depending on dealerships. It featured an exclusive metallic paint job, and was offered with a comfort package, including air conditioning, french flag colored seat fabric and Disney themed sun shades. It was powered with the 1.1L TU1JP engine.

Citroën C2 (T21)

In November 2006, the Chinese joint venture Dongfeng Peugeot-Citroën launched a derivative version of the Peugeot 206 known as the Citroën C2. While it shares the same nameplate with a European-market model, it is instead a 206 with a modified front and rear body.  In 2012, Citroën released a crossover-styled version called the Citroën C2 Cross. Almost 80,000 Citroën C2 were produced in China from 2006 to 2013.

Naza 206 Bestari
In Malaysia, the 206 was also marketed under the Naza name. It was sold as the Naza 206 Bestari, and was available in 1.4L petrol engine (TU3JP), and with the option of 5- speed manual transmission and 4-speed automatic transmission (codename AL4). It was replaced by the 206 SD, which was renamed as the 207 in Malaysia.

Powertrain

206+ (2009–2013)

The 206+ is a facelifted version of the 206, with a new front end and styling, similar to the European 207. It was manufactured in Mulhouse, France, and was launched in February 2009.

In May 2008, Peugeot's Brazilian branch announced it would not manufacture nor import the Peugeot 207 to Brazil, but instead it would change some elements of the 206 already in production, arguing it would be impractical to do otherwise. The car, launched in August 2008, had minor changes to mechanical parts such as the suspension and gearbox. It is marketed between the original 206 and the European 207, having the Volkswagen Fox, Renault Clio Campus and the Chevrolet Agile as its main competitors. It is offered in 3- and 5-door hatchback, estate and 4-door saloon bodystyles, including a facelifted 207 Escapade.

The car is sold under the "207 Compact" nameplate in Argentina (country in which it is also produced) and Uruguay, in order to differentiate it from the European 207 CC and RC, which are also sold in those countries. Peugeot planned to name it "207 Brasil" in Brazil, but soon dropped the "Brasil" from the name, as this decision gained generally negative reactions from the media. The Brazilian 207 has also been criticized because it was perceived essentially as a facelifted 206, despite Peugeot's efforts to market it as an entirely new car and even selling it at a higher base price.

In February 2009, Peugeot announced that this revised model will be made at the Mulhouse plant in France for the European (left-hand drive only) market, badged as the 206+. as a patriotic recession-beating rejoinder to Renault's initiative of importing low priced Dacias from Romania. In May 2009 the company announced the recruitment of an additional 450 workers to support production at Mulhouse of the 206+ and the two door 308 models also assembled at this facility. This plant exported the model under the 207 Compact nameplate to Chile (since 2010), Mexico (2009–2011) and the Dominican Republic.

From October 2010, Naza Group started the assembly of the 207 sedan in Malaysia. It was also exported throughout RHD Southeast Asian and South Asian markets such as Thailand, Indonesia, Brunei, and Sri Lanka.

Iran Khodro Company (IKCO), which produces the Peugeot 206 in Iran since April 2001, has announced the production of the "207i" in hatchback version. In the initial phase, 5,000 Peugeot 207i (206+) cars would be produced by the end of the current Iranian year (March 2010), and will increase to 15,000–20,000 annually.
At the end of year 2011, 207i producing in IKCO stopped temporary during relation cut between IKCO and Peugeot because of international sanctions against Iran.
However, in early 2016 its production restarted in Iran.

From May 2013, Peugeot no longer offers the 206+ in Europe due to higher demands of the newer 208 and the introduction of the 207-based 301.

Safety

The 206 in its standard European configuration received 4 stars for adult occupants and 2 stars for pedestrians from Euro NCAP in 2000.

The 207 Compact in its most basic Latin American configuration with no airbags received 1 star for adult occupants and 2 stars for toddlers from Latin NCAP in 2010.

The 207 Compact with 2 airbags received 2 stars for adult occupants and 2 stars for toddlers from Latin NCAP in 2010.

Motorsport

In 1999, Peugeot Sport unveiled the 206 WRC, and it competed for the first time in that year's World Rally Championship, with French tarmac veteran and long-time marque stalwart Gilles Panizzi narrowly failing, against a resurgent reigning champion in Mitsubishi's Tommi Mäkinen, to win the Rallye Sanremo. The car was soon a success, however, and won both the manufacturers' and drivers' championships in 2000, Peugeot's first such accolades since their withdrawal from the WRC after Group B was banned after the 1986 season, and achieved in the hands of Panizzi, Francois Delecour and Mäkinen's successor as drivers' world champion, Marcus Grönholm.

For 2001, Grönholm competed alongside two refugees of SEAT's exit from the championship at the end of 2000; compatriot Harri Rovanperä and the French 1994 world champion, Didier Auriol. Rovanperä and Auriol each contributed single wins, on Swedish Rally and Rally Catalunya respectively (the former to be a sole career win for the Finn, and the latter victory helped by assorted problems for the blisteringly quick debuting Citroën Xsara WRCs), before Auriol left the team at the end of the season. Grönholm, meanwhile, suffered sufficient reliability woes in the first half of the year such that he could manage no higher than fourth overall in the series, although Peugeot did fend off Ford, with a 1–2 result by the two Finns on the season-ending Rally of Great Britain to successfully defend the constructors' championship title.

In 2002, Grönholm – despite now being paired in the factory line-up with defending 2001 champion from Subaru, the Briton Richard Burns – led Peugeot to a repeat of the WRC title double aboard his 206 WRC. His dominance that year was compared to Michael Schumacher's dominance of Formula One. In summary, Peugeot won two drivers' championships, in 2000 and 2002, and three manufacturers' titles in a row between 2000 and 2002. However, by 2003 the 206 WRC was beginning to show its age and was less effective against the competition, notably the newer Xsara WRC and the Subaru Impreza WRC, so it was retired from competition at the end of the season, to be replaced with the 307 WRC, albeit, unlike its predecessor, based not on the production version's hatchback, but its coupé cabriolet body style.

The Peugeot 206 WRC was awarded the Autosport "Rally Car of the Year" in 2002, preceded by the Ford Focus RS WRC and followed by the Citroën Xsara WRC.

In 2002, Peugeot GB created the Peugeot 206 Cup, a one-make rally championship aimed at young drivers. The championship was created to help young drivers develop their careers. The cars were built by Vic Lee Racing and drivers such as Tom Boardman, Luke Pinder and Garry Jennings all drove in the championship. A similar championship also existed in France.

Advertising
In 2003, Peugeot launched a popular television commercial for the Peugeot 206 directed by Matthijs van Heijningen, with Creative Direction by Roberto Greco and Giovanni Porro from Euro RSCG of Milan-Italy, known as "The Sculptor", involved a young man in India who sees the 206 advertised in a magazine and then goes about damaging a Hindustan Ambassador (including having an elephant sit on it) and then spending the night welding it. The following day, the car emerges as an exact replica of the 206's shape – except with many dents and discolorations. The man then takes his 206 replica driving with friends, with many interested onlookers. The track playing is "Heaven Is A Place On Earth" by Raja Mushtaq, later remixed as "Husan", by Bhangra Knights.

The commercial won a number of prestigious international advertising awards:
 Gold, Cannes Lions International Festival of Creativity 2003, Cars category.
 Gold, Clio Awards 2003, Product/Service: Automotive category.
 Gold, ADC*E 2003, TV Commercials category.
 The Cresta Awards 2003.
 Grand Prix, International Car Advertising Film Festival 2002.
 Grand Prix, Caucasus International Festival of Advertisement (CIFA) 2002.
 Gold, Caucasus International Festival of Advertisement (CIFA) 2002.
 Epica d’Or, EPICA (Europe's Premier Creative Awards) 2002.
 Gold, EPICA (Europe's Premier Creative Awards) 2002, Automobiles category.
 Grand Prix, Eurobest - The European Advertising Festival 2002.

In March 2018, the commercial was recreated in celebration of the 206's 20th anniversary. The commercial is essentially similar to the original, except that the Ambassador became a replica of the Peugeot 208 GTI.

Awards
 "The Most Beautiful Car of the Year 1998", Festival Automobile International, 1998.
 "Best Petrol Small Car" and "Best Diesel Small Car", Fleet Excellence Awards, 2001
 "Best Convertible" (Peugeot 206CC), What Car? awards, 2001.
 "Best Used Supermini", What Car? magazine, 2001.
 "Car of the Show" (Peugeot 206CC), British International Motor Show, 2000.
 "Best-Selling Car in Europe 2001-2003".

Production and sales

Production milestone

Sales

See also
Citroën C3
IKCO Runna
Peugeot 207
Peugeot 205

Notes

References

External links

Official international 206 English website
Iran Khodro Company official website Peugeot 206
generation206

2000s cars
2010s cars
Cars introduced in 1998
Convertibles
Euro NCAP superminis
Latin NCAP superminis
Front-wheel-drive vehicles
Cars of Argentina
Cars of Brazil
Cars of China
Hatchbacks
206
Sedans
Sport compact cars
Station wagons
Subcompact cars
Cars powered by transverse 4-cylinder engines
Rally cars